Beauchamps is a commune in the Somme department in Hauts-de-France in northern France.

Geography
Situated at the junction of the D 2 and D 1015 roads by the banks of the river Bresle, the border of the departments of the Somme and Seine-Maritime.

Population

See also
Communes of the Somme department

References

Communes of Somme (department)